Klaus Heinlein (born 23 December 1953) is a German former professional footballer who played as a midfielder in Germany for SpVgg Greuther Fürth and in the North American Soccer League for the Edmonton Drillers.

References

External links 
 NASL career stats
 

1953 births
Living people
German footballers
Association football midfielders
2. Bundesliga players
North American Soccer League (1968–1984) players
SpVgg Greuther Fürth players
Edmonton Drillers (1979–1982) players
German expatriate footballers
German expatriate sportspeople in Canada
Expatriate soccer players in Canada
Sportspeople from Fürth
Footballers from Bavaria